Shargë is a village in Tirana County, Albania. It is part of the municipality Vorë.

References

Populated places in Vorë
Villages in Tirana County